Jón úr Vör (1917–2000) was an Icelandic poet. He has been credited, along with Steinn Steinarr, as being one of those who brought a modernist approach into Icelandic poetry. This was through the publication of his book of poems in 1946 entitled Þorpið (The Village).<ref>Ástráður Eysteinsson, Vivian Liska eds (2007) Modernism, Volume 1 of Comparative history of literatures in European languages, John Benjamins Publishing, 9789027234544</ref>Stevens, Patrick J. (2004). Icelandic writers. Farmington Hills, MI: Thomson/Gale.

 Selected publications 
 Jón úr Vör. (1956) Þorpið'', Reykjavík: Heimskringla.
 Steinn Steinarr, Jón úr Vör, Matthías Johannessen, and Marshall Brement (1985) Three modern Icelandic poets: selected poems of Steinn Steinarr, Jón úr Vör and Matthías Johannessen. Reykjavík, Iceland: Iceland Review.

References

1917 births
2000 deaths
Icelandic male poets
20th-century Icelandic poets
20th-century male writers